Vidumelon wattii is a species of land snail in the family Camaenidae. It is known commonly as Watt's land snail. It is endemic to Australia, where it is limited to a range no more than 10 kilometers wide located near Alice Springs.

This snail has a tightly coiled shell approximately one centimeter wide. It lives in leaf litter and probably consumes dead plant matter.

References

External links

wattii
Gastropods of Australia
Endemic fauna of Australia
Gastropods described in 1894
Taxonomy articles created by Polbot